Helen Weinzweig (1915–2010), née Tenenbaum, was a Canadian writer. The author of two novels and a short story collection, her novel Basic Black with Pearls won the Toronto Book Award in 1981, and her short story collection A View from the Roof was a shortlisted nominee for the Governor General's Award for English-language fiction in 1989.

Born in Poland in 1915, she emigrated to Canada at age nine with her mother, and married composer John Weinzweig  on July 12, 1940. She published her first short story, "Surprise!", in Canadian Forum in 1967, and her debut novel Passing Ceremony was published in 1973. She came to be regarded as one of Canada's first important feminist writers. Her style was marked by experimental forms with some aspects of metafiction; in her short story "Journey to Porquis", a writer on a train trip realizes that all of his fellow passengers are characters in his novel.

Weinzweig also wrote and produced a one-act play, My Mother's Luck, and several of her short stories in A View from the Roof were adapted for stage and CBC Radio broadcast by playwright Dave Carley.

Weinzweig died in 2010, aged 94.

Works
 Passing Ceremony (1973)
 Basic Black with Pearls (1981)
 in German, transl. Brigitte Jakobeit: Schwarzes Kleid mit Perlen. Wagenbach, Berlin 2019
 My mother's luck (1983)
 A View from the Roof (1989)
 Nero e perle (1994)

Archive
Helen Weinzweig papers, Coll. 1945-2003 at the library, University of Toronto

External links

References

1915 births
2010 deaths
Canadian women novelists
Canadian women dramatists and playwrights
Writers from Toronto
20th-century Canadian novelists
20th-century Canadian dramatists and playwrights
Jewish Canadian writers
Polish emigrants to Canada
Canadian feminist writers
Canadian women short story writers
20th-century Canadian women writers
20th-century Canadian short story writers